Zorra is a township in Oxford County, situated in south-western Ontario, Canada. A predominantly rural municipality, Zorra was formed in 1975 through the amalgamation of East Nissouri, West Zorra and North Oxford townships. It is best known for the Highland Games weekend held each summer in Embro, celebrating the heritage of the Scottish pioneer families which grew from the 1830s to form nearly a quarter of the county's population.

Government
The municipal government is led by a mayor and a councillor from each of the township's four geographic wards:

 Ward 1: Southern portion of township, the former North Oxford township (including Banner, Golspie), excluding Thamesford
 Ward 2: Thamesford
 Ward 3: Northwest portion of township, the former East Nissouri township (including Kintore, Uniondale)
 Ward 4: Northeast portion of township, the former West Zorra township (including Embro, Maplewood)

Marcus Ryan is the current mayor, following the 2018 Ontario municipal elections.

Communities
The township comprises the communities of Banner, Bennington, Brooksdale, Brown's Corners, Cody's Corners, Dicksons Corners, Dunn's Corner, Embro, Golspie, Granthurst, Harrington, Harrington West, Holiday, Kintore, Lakeside, Maplewood, McConkey, Medina, Rayside, Thamesford, Uniondale, Youngsville, and Zorra Station.

Demographics 

Cultural resources
Thamesford Public Library: 165 Dundas Street, Thamesford. A branch of the Oxford County Library.
Embro Public Library : 135 Huron St., Embro. A branch of the Oxford County Library, it is located in the former Embro Town Hall.
 Harrington Community Library : 539 Victoria St, Harrington. A branch of the Oxford County Library. Located in the former Broadview United Church that was built in 1924.
 Harrington Schoolhouse (Community Centre) : 963624 County Road 96. The Old Stone School; initially referred to as S.S. number 17, and subsequently renumbered S.S. number 4, was originally constructed of logs in the mid-1800s. An entrance was located at the north side of the school, and a box stove was used for heating. In 1869, a contract was granted to enlarge the school with a stone addition, to address seating, lighting and other requirements. Purchased by several local residents to be used as a community centre, after the formal closure of one room schools.
Thamesford District Recreation Centre: 85 Middleton street the Haverford arena the skatepark located beside it is a popular location for teens to make out passionately
Schools include the Zorra Highland Park Public School, Thamesford Public School, A. J. Baker Public School and St. Joseph's Catholic School.

Attractions
Embro Highland Games, hosted annually by the Zorra Caledonian Society
Embro Truck & Tractor Pull
Wienerfest Dog Festival, celebrating the world of Dachshunds to provide funding for pet rescue
Garagefest, an annual local music festival to raise funds for various charities
Embro Fall Fair
Calathumpian a celebration of Thamesfords heritage and history

Famous people

 Henry John Cody (1868–1951), MPP and President of the University of Toronto
 Ralph Connor (1860–1937), novelist
 Jonathan Goforth (1859–1936), missionary to China
 Mark Hominick
 Bob Hayward
 James K.A. Smith
 George Leslie Mackay
 Thomas Oliver
 Elizabeth Wettlaufer, convicted serial killer

See also
List of townships in Ontario

References

External links

Lower-tier municipalities in Ontario
Municipalities in Oxford County, Ontario
Township municipalities in Ontario